Mayton was an unincorporated community in Webster County, West Virginia.

References 

Unincorporated communities in West Virginia
Unincorporated communities in Webster County, West Virginia